Arthur Stanley Howard (born 14 November 1936 in Grahamstown, Cape Province) is a South African former first-class cricketer active 1961 who played for Cambridge University. He appeared in three first-class matches for the university team.

Notes

1936 births
Cambridge University cricketers
South African cricketers
Living people
People from Makhanda, Eastern Cape
Cricketers from the Eastern Cape